Edward Kirk Collins (July 18, 1958 – February 22, 1984) was an American football defensive back in the National Football League. He was drafted by the Los Angeles Rams in the seventh round of the 1980 NFL draft. He played college football at Baylor.

Collins was diagnosed with gastroesophageal cancer during the 1983 season, subsequently ending his career. He died of the disease on February 22, 1984.

References

1958 births
1984 deaths
Players of American football from San Antonio
American football defensive backs
Baylor Bears football players
Los Angeles Rams players
Deaths from esophageal cancer
Deaths from cancer in California